Krzysztof Bogdan Lipiec (born 11 October 1959 in Starachowice) is a Polish politician. He was elected to the Sejm on 25 September 2005, getting 4697 votes in 33 Kielce district as a candidate from Law and Justice list.

He was also a member of Senate of Poland from 1997 to 2001.

See also
Members of Polish Sejm 2005-2007

External links
Krzysztof Lipiec - parliamentary page - includes declarations of interest, voting record, and transcripts of speeches.

1959 births
Living people
People from Starachowice
Law and Justice politicians
Solidarity Electoral Action politicians
Members of the Senate of Poland 1997–2001
Members of the Polish Sejm 2005–2007
Members of the Polish Sejm 2007–2011
Members of the Polish Sejm 2011–2015
Members of the Polish Sejm 2015–2019
Members of the Polish Sejm 2019–2023